JPP is a group of Finnish folk musicians, formerly called Järvelän Pikkupelimannit. This may also refer to:

 James Price Point, a headland in the Kimberley Region of Western Australia
 The JPP Development Committee, involved in the JUMP geographic information system

People
 Jean-Pierre Pernaut, (1950-2022) a French news reader and broadcaster
 Jean-Pierre Papin, (born 1963) a  French former football player
 Jason Pierre-Paul, (born 1989) a defensive end for the Baltimore Ravens

Politics
 Jharkhand People's Party, a political party in India
 Juventud del Poder Popular, Colombian political youth organization